Sean King  (born 3 May 1989, Farnborough) is a British water polo player. At the 2012 Summer Olympics, he competed for Great Britain's men's national water polo team in the men's event. He is currently the head of aquatics at Trinity School, Croydon and the water polo coach. He is also a trainer with the Swim England national academy. He has led the school water polo teams to a number of national titles.

See also
 Great Britain men's Olympic water polo team records and statistics

References

External links
 

British male water polo players
1989 births
Living people
Olympic water polo players of Great Britain
Water polo players at the 2012 Summer Olympics
People from Farnborough, Hampshire